Ruel Julian Peter Arcilla simply known as Jay Arcilla (born May 21, 1996) is a YouTube sensation, actor, model and dancer. He is best known for his viral Dubsmash video Twerk It Like Miley by Brandon Beal, and bagged his role as Reggie in the Primetime series broadcast by GMA Network, Little Nanay.

Biography
Arcilla was born and raised in San Pablo, Laguna.

In 2015, he joined Eat Bulaga!'''s segment, That's My Bae: "Twerk It" Dance Contest. The same year, he also joined the comeback StarStruck with its 6th season.

He is the nephew of the lead actor of Heneral Luna, John Arcilla.

Career

That's My Bae
In 2015, he auditioned in an Eat Bulaga! segment, That's My Bae: "Twerk It" Dance Contest''. He is one of the first Baes to enter the Eat Bulaga! stage together with Miggy Tolentino and Tommy Peñaflor. Arcilla did not pass through the Semi-finals because of joining the reality show slated to air in an early September day, StarStruck.

StarStruck
He also auditioned in the comeback of the hit reality show, StarStruck on its 6th season. He has finished his journey as the last contestant eliminated together with Arra San Agustin.

Filmography

Television

See also
 StarStruck (Philippine TV series)
 StarStruck (season 6)

External links
Jay Arcilla on Instagram

Sparkle profile

References

1996 births
Living people
Filipino male television actors
Filipino male dancers
Filipino male models
21st-century Filipino male actors
Participants in Philippine reality television series
StarStruck (Philippine TV series) participants
GMA Network personalities
Male actors from Laguna (province)
People from San Pablo, Laguna
Tagalog people